Udea stellata is a moth of the family Crambidae. It is endemic to the Hawaiian islands of Kauai, Oahu, Molokai and Hawaii.

The larvae feed on Neraudia melastomaefolia and Pipturus albidus. The caterpillars are pale whitish green. They feed on the underside of the leaves. When small they feed singly, often in a groove or unevenness of the surface or beside a rib or vein and are protected by a web. Older caterpillars are found in folded-over leaf margins.

External links

Moths described in 1883
Endemic moths of Hawaii
stellata